EZE may refer to:

People

Nickname 
 Eazy-E (1964–1995), American rapper
 Eric Bischoff (born 1955), American professional wrestler

Surname 
 Chelsea Eze, Nigerian actress
 Chikezie Eze, (born 1985), American singer 
 Dino Eze (born 1984), Nigerian footballer
 Eberechi Eze (born 1998), English-Nigerian footballer
 Emeka Eze (disambiguation)
 Emmanuel Chukwudi Eze, Nigerian-American philosopher
 Joy Eze (born 1988), Nigerian sprinter
 Justina Eze, Nigerian diplomat
 Ndubuisi Eze (born 1984), Nigerian footballer
 Patrick Friday Eze (born 1992), Nigerian footballer
 Stephen Eze (born 1994), Nigerian footballer
 Uche Eze (born 1984), Nigerian blogger

Other uses 
 Eze, an Igbo royal title
 Èze, a commune in France
 Book of Ezekiel
 Eastern Airways, a British airline
 Ministro Pistarini International Airport, in Ezeiza, Buenos Aires, Argentina
 Zekwe language